Magalona is a surname.

People with the surname include:

 Enrique Magalona (1891–1960), Filipino senator
 Pancho Magalona (1923–1998), Filipino actor, son of Enrique
 Francis Magalona (1964–2009), Filipino rapper, son of Pancho
 Maxene Magalona (born 1986), Filipino actress, daughter of Francis
 Frank Magalona (born 1987), Filipino actor and rapper, son of Francis
 Saab Magalona (born 1988), Filipino actress and photographer, daughter of Francis
 Elmo Magalona (born 1994), Filipino actor and singer, son of Francis